The El Paso Formation is a geologic formation that is exposed from the Permian Basin of New Mexico and Texas to southeastern Arizona. It preserves fossils dating back to the Ordovician period.

Description

The formation is composed of gray cherty dolomite, limestone, and smaller amounts of siltstone. The formation often has a mottled appearance. It lies unconformably on the Bliss Formation, the Coronado Sandstone, or (in the Florida Mountains) Precambrian basement, and is overlain by the Montoya Group or Portal Formation.

Fossils
The formation is only sparsely fossiliferous, but contains fossils of echinoderms, gastropods, trilobites, sponge spicules, and Nuia. Rare ostracods, cephalopods, and brachiopods are also found, as is the trace fossil Planolites.

History of investigation
The formation was first named by George Burr Richardson in 1904 for exposures in the Franklin and Hueco Mountains. All Ordovician beds of the Franklin Mountains were originally included in the formation. Richardson later (1908) mapped the formation into the Permian Basin and assigned the upper Ordovician beds to the Montoya Limestone. In 1965, Zeller divided the formation in southwestern New Mexico into the Sierrita and Bat Cave Members. Clemons (1991) divided the formation differently, into the Hitt Canyon, Jose, McKelligon, and Padre Members.

In 1964, R.H. Flowers proposed promoting the El Paso Formation to group rank and recommended several divisions into formations, based largely on biostratigraphy, such as the Big Hatchet Formation, the Cooks Formation, the Florida Mountain Formation, the Scenic Drive Formation, or the Victorio Hills Formation. However, this has not been widely accepted, and Greg H. Mack rejected both the promotion of the El Paso Formation to group rank and the designation of biostratigraphic zones within the El Paso as formations.

See also

 List of fossiliferous stratigraphic units in Texas
 Paleontology in Texas

Footnotes

References
 
 
 
 
 
 
 
 
 
 
 

Limestone formations of the United States
Ordovician formations of New Mexico
Ordovician geology of Texas
Ordovician southern paleotropical deposits